Kane Bradley (born 3 February 2000) is an Australian professional rugby league footballer who plays as a er for the Melbourne Storm in the National Rugby League.

He previously played for the North Queensland Cowboys in the NRL.

Background 
Bradley was born in Sydney, New South Wales, Australia. 

He played his junior rugby league for Revesby Rhinos, Penshurst RSL and Bankstown Sports and attended Bass High School.

Playing career

Early career
In 2017, Bradley played for the Manly-Warringah Sea Eagles in the SG Ball Cup.

In 2018, he played for St. George in the SG Ball and was named in the New South Wales under-18 squad but did not play in their game against Queensland.

On 9 October 2018, Bradley signed with the Wests Tigers, joining their NRL squad on a two-year development contract. 

In 2019, he played for the Tigers' Jersey Flegg Cup side and their NSW Cup affiliate, the Western Suburbs Magpies.

2021
On 5 January, Bradley joined the North Queensland Cowboys on a two-year deal in a player swap deal with Tukimihia Simpkins. He began the season playing for the Mackay Cutters in the Queensland Cup.

In Round 19 of the 2021 NRL season, Bradley made his NRL debut for North Queensland against the Melbourne Storm, scoring a try in the 20-16 defeat.

On 2 August, it was announced that Bradley would miss the rest of the 2021 NRL season with a hand injury.

2022
Bradley spent the entire 2022 season playing for the Mackay Cutters and was released by the Cowboys at the end of the season.

On 22 November, he signed with the Brisbane Tigers in the Queensland Cup and underwent pre-season training with the Melbourne Storm, their NRL affiliate.

2023
In round 2 of the 2023 NRL season, Bradley made his Melbourne Storm debut against the Canterbury Bulldogs. He was presented with his debut jersey (cap 228).

References

External links 
Melbourne Storm profile
QRL profile

2000 births
Living people
Australian rugby league players
Mackay Cutters players
North Queensland Cowboys players
Melbourne Storm players
Rugby league players from Sydney
Rugby league wingers